Nasereddine El Bahari (born April 11, 1986 in Aïn Témouchent) is an Algerian footballer. He currently plays for OM Arzew in the Algerian Ligue Professionnelle 1.

Club career
On June 24, 2012, El Bahari signed a three-year contract with USM Bel Abbès.

References

External links
 DZFoot Profile
 

1986 births
Living people
Algerian footballers
Algerian Ligue Professionnelle 1 players
MC Oran players
People from Aïn Témouchent
Association football forwards
21st-century Algerian people